Oktyabrsky District may refer to:
Oktyabrsky District, Russia, several districts and city districts in Russia
Oktyabrsky District, alternative name of Kastrychnitski District of the city of Minsk, Belarus
Oktyabrsky District, before 1997 the name of Mugalzhar District in Aktobe Region, Kazakhstan
Oktyabr District, Bishkek (Oktyabrsky District), a city district of Bishkek, Kyrgyzstan
Akciabrski District (Oktyabrsky District), a district of Gomel Oblast, Belarus
Zhovtnevy Raion (Oktyabrsky City District), former name of Novobavarskyi Raion, a city district of Kharkiv, Ukraine

See also
 Oktyabrsky (disambiguation)
 Oktyabrsky Okrug (disambiguation)

District name disambiguation pages